Marco Island Historical Museum is a history museum on Marco Island, Florida, Collier County, Florida. It is operated by the Marco Island Historical Society and is part of the Collier County Museum System. Its exhibitions include information on the Calusa Indians and the history of development on Marco Island.

References

External links
Marco Island Museum - Collier County Museums
Marco Island Historical Society

Museums in Collier County, Florida
History museums in Florida